Gidde Palema (born 9 April 1995) is a Swedish Standardbred breeding stallion and former racing trotter by Alf Palema out of Rosie Palema by Ideal du Gazeau.

His most prestigious victories include Oslo Grand Prix (2003, 2004), Copenhagen Cup (2003) and Elitloppet (2004). At the end of his career, the stallion had earned US$3,526,263 (€2,901,135).

Pedigree

References

1995 racehorse births
Swedish standardbred racehorses
Elitlopp winners